An equestrian statue of Venezuelan military and political leader Simón Bolívar by the American artist Felix de Weldon is located in Washington, D.C., at Virginia Avenue NW, 18th Street NW, and C Street NW, near the United States Department of Interior and the Pan American Union Building of the Organization of American States. It was surveyed as part of the Smithsonian Institution's Save Outdoor Sculpture! survey in 1993.

Description

The statue shows Bolívar riding his horse with his proper right arm raised over his head. In that hand he wields his sword, holding it upwards. He wears a military uniform with great detail, including the gold medal that was once George Washington's. The sculpture sits on a base made of granite or marble (142 in. x 72 in. x 184 in., 8 tons).

The sculpture is signed: Felix W. de Weldon / Arch. Faulkner, Kingsbury & Stenhouse

The front of the base is inscribed with:

SIMON BOLIVAR
THE LIBERATOR
BORN JULY 24 1783
CARACAS VENEZUELA
DIED DECEMBER 17 1830
SANTA MARTA COLOMBIA

The east side of the base is inscribed with:

THE REPUBLIC OF VENEZUELA BY THE UNITED STATES OF AMERICA

The west side of the base is inscribed with:

LIBERATED VENEZUELA COLOMBIA ECUADOR PERU BOLIVIA AND PANAMA

Information
The statue was authorized by the United States Congress on July 5, 1949 and permission for the piece to be installed on public property was granted on June 29, 1955. The sculpture was donated by the Venezuelan government, which also paid for its installation.

The sculpture was cast in New York and parts were broken down in order to be transported via highway to Washington. The head, neck and rider were disconnected to make it under the overpasses along the highways.

Condition

This sculpture was surveyed in June 1993 for its condition and it was stated that the sculpture was "well maintained."

See also
Other equestrian statues of Bolivar
Simon Bolivar (Tadolini)
Merida, Venezuela
 Statue of Simón Bolívar, London
 List of public art in Washington, D.C., Ward 2
Statues of the Liberators

References

External links

Statue in google street view
Equestrian of Simón Bolívar in the Classified Structures database from NPS.

1959 sculptures
Artworks in the collection of the National Park Service
Bronze sculptures in Washington, D.C.
Equestrian statues in Washington, D.C.
Monuments and memorials in Washington, D.C.
Foggy Bottom
Outdoor sculptures in Washington, D.C.
Sculptures of men in Washington, D.C.
Statues of Simón Bolívar in the United States